Northbourne is a village and civil parish near Deal in Kent, England. It has a public house, The Hare and Hounds, a primary school and is the home of the current, and prior, Baron Northbourne. It should not be confused with an area in Bournemouth of the same name.

KentSalads Ltd were based in Northbourne until they relocated to Tilmanstone and renamed themselves Tilmanstone Salads. Kentsalads were the first UK company to produce Iceberg lettuce commercially.

Within the parish is The Miner's Way Trail, which links up the coalfield parishes of East Kent.

References

External links

Villages in Kent
Dover District
Civil parishes in Kent